The list of bus routes in New York City has been split by borough:
 List of bus routes in Manhattan
 List of bus routes in Brooklyn
 List of bus routes in the Bronx
 List of bus routes in Queens
 List of bus routes in Staten Island
There is also a list of express bus routes:
 List of express bus routes in New York City

See also

List of bus routes in Nassau County, New York
List of bus routes in Suffolk County, New York
List of bus routes in Westchester County
Lists of New Jersey Transit bus routes